Ringiculidae are a family of minute deep water sea snails, marine gastropod mollusks or micromollusks in the informal group Lower Heterobranchia.

Ringiculidae is the only family within the superfamily Ringiculoidea.

The shells of species in this family superficially resemble minute versions of the shells of the Cassinae.

Genera
Genera in the family Ringiculidae include:
 Genus † Avellana d'Orbigny, 1842 
 Genus Microglyphis Dall, 1902
 Microglyphis breviculus Dall, 1902 - Distribution America
 Microglyphis curtulus Dall - Distribution: Patagonia
 Microglyphis estuarinus Dall, 1908 - Distribution: West America
 Microglyphis globularis Smith, 1875 - Distribution: Japan
 Microglyphis japonicus T. Habe, 1952 - Distribution: Indo-Pacific
 Microglyphis mazatlanicus Dall, 1908 - Distribution: West America
 Microglyphis perconicus Dall, 1890 - Distribution: West America
 Genus Pseudoringicula Lin, 1980
 Genus Ringicula Deshayes, 1838
 Genus Ringiculoides Minichev, 1966 - with the only species Ringiculoides kurilensis Minichev, 1966
 Genus Ringiculopsis Chavan, 1947 - with the only species Ringiculopsis foveolata (Yokoyama, 1928)
 Genus Ringiculospongia Sacco, 1892

Genera brought into synonymy
 Hyporingicula Habe, 1952: synonym of Microglyphis Dall, 1902
 Plicatra F. Nordsieck, 1972: synonym of Ringicula Deshayes, 1838
 Ringactaeon F. Nordsieck, 1972: synonym of Ringicula Deshayes, 1838
 Ringiculadda Iredale, 1936: synonym of Ringiculina Monterosato, 1884: synonym of Ringicula (Ringiculina) Monterosato, 1884 represented as Ringicula Deshayes, 1838
 Ringiculina Monterosato, 1884: synonym of Ringicula Deshayes, 1838

References

 Vaught, K.C. (1989). A classification of the living Mollusca. American Malacologists: Melbourne, FL (USA). . XII, 195 pp.
 Bouchet P., Rocroi J.P., Hausdorf B., Kaim A., Kano Y., Nützel A., Parkhaev P., Schrödl M. & Strong E.E. (2017). Revised classification, nomenclator and typification of gastropod and monoplacophoran families. Malacologia. 61(1-2): 1-526

Further reading
 Morlet L. 1878. Monographie du genre Ringicula: et description de quelques especes nouvelles.

 
Taxa named by Rodolfo Amando Philippi